John Davenport (January 9, 1788 – July 18, 1855) was a U.S. Representative from Ohio.

Born near Winchester, Virginia, Davenport attended the common schools. He moved to Ohio in 1818 and engaged in mercantile pursuits. Davenport settled in Belmont County, Ohio. There he served as member of the State house of representatives in 1824, 1827, and 1830. He served as member of the State senate in 1825 and 1826.

Davenport was elected as an Adams candidate to the Twentieth Congress (March 4, 1827 – March 3, 1829). He was an unsuccessful candidate for reelection in 1828 to the Twenty-first Congress. Davenport was twice elected by the legislature as judge of the Monroe judicial circuit.

John Davenport died in Woodsfield, Ohio, July 18, 1855, with interment at Green Mount Cemetery in Barnesville, Ohio.

Family
John Davenport's wife was Martha Coulson of Virginia, the daughter of American Revolutionary War veteran Captain Coulson, while his father was also served in that war. Davenport's grandson from his daughter Frances Ellen Davenport, William D. Hare, served as a state legislator in Oregon.

Sources

1788 births
1855 deaths
People from Belmont County, Ohio
Members of the Ohio House of Representatives
Ohio state senators
National Republican Party members of the United States House of Representatives from Ohio
19th-century American politicians
People from Winchester, Virginia